Tyrosol is an organic compound with the formula . Classified as a phenylethanoid, i.e. a derivative of phenethyl alcohol, It is found in a variety of natural sources. The compound is colorless solid. The principal source in the human diet is olive oil.

Research 
As an antioxidant, tyrosol may protect cells against injury due to oxidation in vitro. Although it is not as potent as other antioxidants present in olive oil (e.g., hydroxytyrosol), its higher concentration and good bioavailability indicate that it may have an important overall effect.

Tyrosol may also be cardioprotective. Trosol-treated animals showed significant increase in the phosphorylation of Akt, eNOS and FOXO3a. In addition, tyrosol also induced the expression of the protein SIRT1 in the heart after myocardial infarction in a rat MI model.

Tyrosol forms esters with a variety of organic acids.

See also 
 tyrosinol, 
 hydroxytyrosol, 
 Salidroside

References 

Phenylethanoids
Phenol antioxidants